The Donbas operation of 1919 was a military campaign of the Russian Civil War, in which the Southern Front of the Red Army regained control of the Donbas region from the Armed Forces of South Russia.

Prelude 
Since the White victory during the battle for the Donbas in June 1919, the region had remained in the hands of the Armed Forces of South Russia, under the command of Vladimir May-Mayevsky and Andrei Shkuro. The Reds tried to regain Donbas in August 1919, but the offensive, in which the 8th and 13th Red Armies took part, only managed to reach Kupiansk. The aim of the Donbas operation was to regain this area, destroy the White troops and prevent them from retreating to the area of the former Donbas District.

After the victory of Semyon Budyonny's cavalry at Voronezh and Kastornoye, in October and November, and then the recapture of the Ukrainian Soviet capital of Kharkiv, on 11 December, the Red Army advanced rapidly south. Until the fall of Kharkiv, the Whites had retreated in an organized and orderly manner, but after losing this city, their retreat turned into a disorderly escape, the more so as the wounded and those suffering from typhus were moving along with the soldiers. On 16 December, the Red Army reached the line of Kupiansk-Svatove-Bilolutsk.

In order to prevent the Reds from crossing the Donets, the Whites managed to concentrate in the region a grouping consisting of Pavlov's 4th Don Corps, Sergei Ulagay's 2nd Kuban Corps, Andrei Shkuro's 3rd Kuban Corps and Chesnokov's 3rd Cavalry Division. The main strike of the Donbas operation was to be carried out by the 1st Cavalry Army, striking towards the railway stations Popasna and Ilovaisk and Debaltseve. At the same time, some of the Red forces were tasked with hitting Taganrog, to prevent the Whites from retreating east  and cut their area in half. Anatoliy Gekker's 13th Army was to perform a supporting attack in the direction of Sloviansk and Yuzivka, while Grigory Sokolnikov's 8th Army was entrusted with the task of capturing Luhansk.

Offensive
The Red Army offensive began on 18 December 1919. The 1st Cavalry Army crossed the Donets on 23 December, followed soon after by the 13th Army. A group of White soldiers concentrated in the vicinity of Bakhmut and Popasna in order to throw the enemy beyond the river and go to the defense, but this goal was not achieved. On 25 December, the 1st Cavalry Army went on the offensive again. Ulagay's forces were completely smashed, with Anton Denikin later being informed that the Whites no longer had cavalry. Two days later, the Red Army captured Luhansk, a day later the Whites had to leave Bakhmut, on 29 December, they also left Debaltseve. On 30 December, the Reds also captured Horlivka, breaking the last attempt by the Whites to defend their positions. 

The last points of White control in Donbas - Ilovaisk, Amvrosiivka,  and Rovenky - were captured on 1 January 1920. Having suffered considerable losses, the Whites withdrew in direction of Crimea and Rostov-on-Don. Morale in their ranks was extremely low after the recent defeats and conflicts between the White commanders. Continuing its march south, on 6 January 1920, the Red Army seized Mariupol and Taganrog, reaching the Black Sea, thereby cutting off White forces in Crimea and the Odesa region from the rest of Denikin's troops in the Don region and in the North Caucasus. Thanks to this success, in the following days it was possible to carry out an operation into the Don region and capture Novocherkassk on 7 January and Rostov-on-Don on 9 January.

References

Bibliography
 
 
 

Battles of the Russian Civil War
Conflicts in 1919